Poussanges is a commune in the Creuse department in the Nouvelle-Aquitaine region in central France.

Geography
The commune is within the natural park of the ‘Millevaches’ (1000 lakes, not cows).

Population

Sights
 The church, dating from the fourteenth century.
 The ruins of the château de Ribeyreix.

See also
Communes of the Creuse department

References

Communes of Creuse